Johannes Jacobus (Lang Hans) Janse van Rensburg (12 August 1779 – July 1836) was a leader of one of the early Voortrekker groups. His entire group of 51 people was massacred by an 'impi' of Manukosi near Inhambane. Only his two children were spared, as a result of an intervention by another Zulu warrior. Included in the party was Nicholaas Balthasar Prinsloo, who was a Slagtersnek rebel, his wife, Petronella Maria Krugel/Kruger and their family.

References 

1779 births
1836 deaths
Great Trek
South African explorers